The Mexican dace (Evarra bustamantei), or Mexican chub, is an extinct species of ray-finned fish in the family Cyprinidae.  It was found only in Mexico, in the canals and streams of the Valley of Mexico. It is estimated to have become extinct circa 1983. The extinction of this species coincided with the drying of water bodies in the valley. This drying was a result of the increasing demands placed on the water resources of the valley by agriculture, as well as by the growth of Mexico City and its suburbs.

Sources

Evarra
Fish described in 1955
Endemic fish of Mexico
Freshwater fish of Mexico
Fish of North America becoming extinct since 1500
Taxonomy articles created by Polbot